Savvas Giannakidis (born 19 November 1977) is a Greek former professional footballer.

References

1977 births
Living people
Greek footballers
Paniliakos F.C. players
Athinaikos F.C. players
Ethnikos Asteras F.C. players
Thrasyvoulos F.C. players
Diagoras F.C. players
Pierikos F.C. players
Koropi F.C. players
Super League Greece players
Association football forwards
Footballers from Western Macedonia
People from Kozani (regional unit)